East Falkland was a constituency of the Legislative Council of the Falkland Islands which was in existence from the first elections in the Falklands in 1949 until the 1985 election when the Falkland Islands Constitution came into force, abolishing the constituency. The constituency of East Falkland elected one member to the Legislative Council and consisted of the whole area of the island of East Falkland, excluding Stanley, and some neighbouring islands.  In 1964 it became the first seat to elect a female Councillor, Marjorie Vinson. East Falkland is now part of the Camp constituency.

Members

References

Historic constituencies in the Falkland Islands